is a former Japanese football player.

Playing career
Ochi was born in Ageo on July 17, 1982. He joined J1 League club Cerezo Osaka from Yokohama F. Marinos youth team in 2001. He debuted in August and played several matches as left side back in 2001 season. However Cerezo finished at the bottom place and was relegated to J2 League. In 2002, he could not play at all in the match. In 2003, he moved to J2 club Montedio Yamagata. However he played only 2 matches in 2003 and could not play at all in the match in 2004. He retired end of 2004 season.

Club statistics

References

External links

1982 births
Living people
Association football people from Saitama Prefecture
Japanese footballers
J1 League players
J2 League players
Cerezo Osaka players
Montedio Yamagata players
People from Ageo, Saitama
Association football defenders